The California State University, San Bernardino's Jack H. Brown College of Business and Public Administration is a California State University, San Bernardino business school in San Bernardino, California, United States. Comprising seven departments/schools and various specialties, the College offers bachelor's and master's. The College strives to produce educated graduates who possess both a fundamental understanding of their fields and the essential professional skills needed by local and regional industries. The College provides business information for all California State University, San Bernardino graduates. The College has many accredited programs.

Many CSUSB programs have earned specialized national and international accreditation, including the business program, which was the first in the Inland Empire to gain AACSB Accreditation at both the graduate and undergraduate levels. AACSB Accreditation represents the highest standard of achievement for business schools worldwide. Less than 5% of the world's 13,000 business programs have earned AACSB Accreditation. AACSB-accredited schools produce graduates that are highly skilled and more desirable to employers than other non-accredited schools. The business and entrepreneurship programs are nationally recognized, as evidenced by CSUSB's 2006 ranking of fourth in the United States for graduate entrepreneur programs and the AACSB's Entrepreneurship Spotlight determined the School of Entrepreneurship and the Inland Empire Center for Entrepreneurship among the Top 35 Globally ranked programs for fostering entrepreneurship. The university's College of Business and Public Administration was also listed in the 2008 edition and the 2013 edition of The Princeton Review's "Best 290 Business Schools.". In 2011, California State University, San Bernardino’s College of Business and Public Administration was recognized by European CEO Magazine as one of the top 22 schools of business in the world, a vanity award. In addition, CSUSB's advanced accounting students provide free tax preparation services to local low-income, elderly, disabled, non-English-speaking residents.

Academics

Departments
The Jack H. Brown College of Business and Public Administration at CSUSB includes:
 Accounting & Finance
 Information & Decision Sciences
 Management
 Marketing
 Public Administration
 School of Entrepreneurship

References

External links
 Official website

Business schools in California
California State University, San Bernardino